Ruy Kopper (3 July 1930 – 26 March 2010) was a Brazilian rower. He competed in the men's coxed four event at the 1956 Summer Olympics.

References

External links
 

1930 births
2010 deaths
Brazilian male rowers
Olympic rowers of Brazil
Rowers at the 1956 Summer Olympics
Sportspeople from Rio Grande do Sul